Apamea roedereri is a moth of the family Noctuidae. It is found in northern Madagascar.

Its wingspan ranges from 45 to 67 mm and the forewings are 23 to 33 mm in length. The female is larger than the male.

References

External links

Moths described in 1967
Apamea (moth)
Moths of Madagascar